David Booth works full-time in research and research teaching as an honorary professor at the School of Psychology in the College of Life and Environmental Sciences of the University of Birmingham (UK). According to his Web page  he investigates the ways in which an individual's life works. His research and teaching centre on the processes in the mind that fit acts and reactions of human beings and animals to the passing situation.

Work
David Booth carried out work that contradicted the theory that dual centres of the hypothalamus control eating, the lateral hypothalamus for hunger  and the ventromedial hypothalamus for satiety  and began to replace it with a theory of the control of food choice and intake through learnt connections distributed around the brain.  With colleagues he built a simulation of the physiological and learning mechanisms influencing eating patterns in people and laboratory animals, and extended it to include cultural and interpersonal influences.

References 

Living people
1938 births
Academics of the University of Birmingham